Cloud game may refer to:

 Cloud (video game)
 Cloud gaming